White Mountain Peak (or simply White Mountain), at , is the highest peak in the White Mountains of California, the highest peak in Mono County, and the third highest peak in the state after Mount Whitney and Mount Williamson. 

It is the fourteenth most topographically prominent peak in the contiguous United States. White Mountain Peak is one of only two fourteeners (peaks above 14,000 feet) in California that are not in the Sierra Nevada, the other being Mount Shasta at the far northern end of the state in the Cascade Range. It is the only fourteener in the contiguous United States that is not in the Rocky Mountains, the Cascade Range, or the Sierra Nevada. It is in the Inyo-White Mountains.

Research Station
The effects of altitude on physiology are studied at the Barcroft Station and summit hut.

Climbing

There is a winding dirt road leading to the summit station that is usually cleared of snow between late June and September. Access is restricted to hikers only by a locked gate about 2 miles before Barcroft Station, but White Mountain Research Station usually opens this locked gate at  once each year. Open gate days are typically held on a Sunday in the summer season. 

However, there are two different dips in the trail of about 250 feet each, adding up to a total elevation gain during the roundtrip of over 3500 feet. This route is popular with mountain bikers.

While the peak is arguably California's easiest fourteener via the jeep road, it features more strenuous climbs such as its western ridge, an  climb out of Owens Valley via a steep ridge from the end of a rough road. Another route from the East, up Wyman Canyon from the Deep Springs Valley, has a lot of water sources in the first 12 miles.  It climbs 7,100 feet to the summit.  The peak is rarely approached from the north where it is guarded by a narrow arête or knife-edge ridge. A better nontechnical alternative to the jeep road would be to drive as far as possible up Leidy Canyon from Fish Lake Valley, then take a graded cattle trail up the broad ridge to Perry Aiken Flat. 

From the flats it is an easy traverse south into the cirque of the North Fork, North Branch of Perry Aiken Creek. A moderate scramble up the ridge between the North Branch and the larger cirque of the main North Fork leads to the easier upper slopes of the peak. While the peak does not require technical climbing skills, it still poses a serious challenge to hikers because of the high altitude.

Climate
The summit and the weather station at  has an alpine tundra climate (Köppen climate classification: ET).

See also

 
 List of mountain peaks of California
 List of highest points in California by county
 List of Ultras of the United States

References

External links
 
 
 
 
 White Mountain Research Station. Administrative Files RSS 2308. Special Collections & Archives, UC San Diego Library.

White Mountains (California)
Mountains of Mono County, California
Fourteeners of California
Inyo National Forest
North American 4000 m summits
Mountains of Northern California